The National Association of Free Will Baptists (NAFWB) is a national body of Free Will Baptist churches in the United States and Canada, organized on November 5, 1935 in Nashville, Tennessee. The Association traces its history in the United States through two different lines: one beginning in the South in 1727 (the "Palmer line") and another in the North in 1780 (the "Randall line"). The "Palmer line," however, never developed as a formal denomination. It consisted of only about three churches in North Carolina. The NAFWB is the largest of the Free Will Baptist denominations.

History
In 1702, English General Baptists who had settled in the Province of Carolina requested help from the General Baptists in England. Though they did not receive the requested assistance, native Paul Palmer labored there about 25 years later, and founded the first "General" or "Free Will" Baptist church in Chowan County, North Carolina, in 1727. (Many General Baptists held to general atonement but "personal predestination" or eternal security.) Palmer organized at least three churches in North Carolina. From one church in 1727, the fellowship grew to over 20 churches by 1755. After 1755, the churches began to decrease and many churches and members became Particular Baptists. By 1770, only four churches and four ministers remained of the General Baptist persuasion. By the end of the 18th century, these churches were being referred to as "Free Will Baptist." The churches in the "Palmer" line would again experience growth slowly in the 19th century. They organized various associations and conferences, and finally organized into the General Conference of Free Will Baptists in 1921. The problem with the history of Paul Palmer, however, stems from the fact that it is uncertain exactly what view of perseverance he actually held.  In fact, some church historians think he was Calvinistic in his views.  He had come from the Welsh Tract Church, which was openly Calvinistic.

Another "Free Will" movement rose in the North through the work of Benjamin Randall (1749–1808). Randall united with the Regular Baptists in 1776, but broke with them in 1779 due to his more liberal views on predestination. In 1780, Randall formed a "Free" Baptist church in New Durham, New Hampshire. More churches were founded, and in 1792 a Yearly Meeting was organized. This northern line of Free Will Baptists expanded rapidly, but the majority of the churches merged with the Northern Baptist Convention in 1911. A remnant of the Randall churches organized in 1917 as the Cooperative General Association of Free Will Baptists.

Representatives of the "Palmer" (General Conference) and "Randall" (Cooperative General Association) groups of Free Will Baptists met at Cofer's Chapel in Nashville, Tennessee, in 1935 and organized the National Association of Free Will Baptists as a merger of the two groups. The new association adopted the Treatise on the Faith and Practice of the Free Will Baptists, which has been revised several times since then. As of August 2005, the Association claims to have over 2,400 churches in 42 states and 14 foreign countries. The NAFWB is actively involved in missionary work in the United States and throughout the world. The Association operates a publishing arm called Randall House. Three colleges, Welch College (formerly the Free Will Baptist Bible College) in Nashville; Randall University (formerly known as Hillsdale Free Will Baptist College) in Moore, Oklahoma; and Southeastern Free Will Baptist College in Wendell, North Carolina are affiliated with the Association. The NAFWB offices are presently maintained in Antioch, Tennessee, a neighborhood of Nashville.

Theology
The churches of the National Association of Free Will Baptists are theologically conservative and hold an Arminian view of salvation, notably in the belief of conditional security and rejection of the belief of eternal security held by many larger bodies of Baptists, such as most of Southern Baptists and adherents of African-American Baptist groups. The Arminian tradition was fashioned in the Netherlands in the 17th century against scholastic Calvinism and its deterministic interpretation of historic Christian teachings about predestination. Similar views, albeit with different emphases from Free Will Baptists, may be found in American Christianity within Methodism and the Restoration movement (e.g., Disciples of Christ, Churches of Christ).

In addition, NAFWB congregations differ from most Baptists in holding that three ordinances, rather than the two observed by most of Protestantism, must be practiced by the church; specifically, in addition to Believer's Baptism (that is, administered to persons able to understand the significance of the ordinance, with a repentant heart) and the Lord's supper practiced by other Baptists, Free Will Baptists also practice the ordinance of the washing of feet. In some churches, anointing with oil is also practiced, depending on local custom.

Membership
Since the middle of the 20th century, membership has remained near 200,000. In 2007, the Association reported having 2,369 churches and 185,798 members. Membership is concentrated in the Southern United States. The states with the highest membership rates are Arkansas, Oklahoma, West Virginia, Alabama, and Kentucky.

Free Will Baptist North American Ministries (known as Free Will Baptist Home Missions until 2015) has 89 active mission works in 26 states.  Their primary role is to send missionaries into North America to plant Free Will Baptist churches. Larry Powel is the Director of Home Missions. They generally have anywhere between 50 and 70 missionaries on the field at any given time. As of 2011 they have missionaries in Alabama, Michigan, South Carolina, Alaska, Minnesota, Tennessee, Arizona, Mississippi, Texas, California, New Mexico, Utah, Canada, New York, Virgin Islands, Colorado, Ohio, Virginia, Idaho, Oklahoma, Washington, Illinois, Pennsylvania, West Virginia, Kentucky, Puerto Rico, Wisconsin, Mexico, and Rhode Island.

References

Sources

External links
National Association of Free Will Baptists
Randall House Publishing
ONE Magazine: The Magazine for Free Will Baptists
A Treatise of the Faith and Practices of the National Association of Free Will Baptists
Profile of the National Association of Free Will Baptists on the Association of Religion Data Archives website

Arminian denominations
Baptist denominations in North America
Baptist Christianity in Tennessee
Free Will Baptists
Christian organizations established in 1935
Baptist denominations established in the 20th century
1935 establishments in Tennessee